Presidential elections were held in Ecuador on 6 June 1948. The elections were supervised by the Supreme Electoral Tribunal for the first time. The result was a victory for Galo Plaza of the National Democratic Civic Movement. He was inaugurated as President on 1 September 1948.

Results

References

Presidential elections in Ecuador
1948 in Ecuador
Ecuador
Election and referendum articles with incomplete results